Suresh Jayaraman  is  Malaysian football referee.

References

External links
 

1988 births
Living people
Malaysian football referees